Refen is a village in Miankuh Rural District of Miankuh District, Ardal County, Chaharmahal and Bakhtiari province, Iran. At the 2006 census, its population was 863 in 198 households. The following census in 2011 counted 919 people in 243 households. The latest census in 2016 showed a population of 991 people in 271 households; it was the largest village in its rural district. The village is populated by Lurs.

References 

Ardal County

Populated places in Chaharmahal and Bakhtiari Province

Populated places in Ardal County

Luri settlements in Chaharmahal and Bakhtiari Province